Thomas Shufflebotham (1881–1939) was an English professional football centre half who played in the Football League for Chesterfield Town. He also played for a number of other clubs.

Career statistics

References

English footballers
Brentford F.C. players
Lincoln City F.C. players
Queens Park Rangers F.C. players
Rotherham Town F.C. (1899) players
Stoke City F.C. players
Chesterfield F.C. players
Workington A.F.C. players
Walsall F.C. players
English Football League players
1881 births
1939 deaths
Southern Football League players
Ilkeston Town F.C. (1880s) players
Association football wing halves